The Kyrgyzstan Cup is Kyrgyzstan's premier knockout tournament in men's football (soccer).

Previous winners
Previous winners of the cup are:

Soviet time

1939 Dinamo Frunze
1940 Spartak Frunze
1941-44 not played
1945 Dinamo Frunze
1946 Burevestnik Frunze
1947 Burevestnik Frunze
1948 Burevestnik Frunze
1949 Burevestnik Frunze
1950 Burevestnik Frunze
1951 Dinamo Frunze
1952 Dinamo Frunze
1953 Frunze City Team
1954 Kalininskoye Town Team
1955 Spartak Frunze
1956 Torpedo Frunze
1957 Kalininskoye Town Team
1958 Kalininskoye Town Team
1959 Torpedo Frunze
1960 Kalininskoye Town Team
1961 Alga Kalininskoye
1962 Alga Kalininskoye
1963 Alga Kalininskoye
1964 Elektrik Frunze
1965 Selmashevets Frunze
1966 Selmashevets Frunze
1967 Instrumentalshchik Frunze
1968 Selmashevets Frunze
1969 Selmashevets Frunze
1970 Selmashevets Frunze
1971 Instrumentalshchik Frunze
1972 Khimik Kara-Balta
1973 Selmashevets Frunze
1974 Instrumentalshchik Frunze
1975 Selmashevets Frunze
1976 Tekstilshchik Frunze
1977 Selmashevets Frunze
1978 Instrumentalshchik Frunze
1979 Instrumentalshchik Frunze
1980 Motor Frunze
1981 Instrumentalshchik Frunze
1982-83 not played
1984 Selmashevets Frunze
1985 Selmashevets Frunze
1986 Elektrik Frunze
1987 Elektrik Frunze
1988 Instrumentalshchik Frunze
1989 Selmashevets Frunze
1990 Selmashevets Frunze
1991 Selmashevets Frunze

Since independence
Winners since 1992 are:

Titles by club 

Zhashtyk Ak Altyn Kara-Suu lost 6 consecutive finals to Alga Bishkek from 2001 to 2003 and to Dordoi Bishkek from 2004 to 2006.

References

External links
Federation FFKR
 FIFA

 
1
National association football cups